is a Japanese manga series written and illustrated by Junji Ito. It was serialized in Comic Motto! from March 2013 to October 2014 and published in a single volume in December 2014.

Publication
Written and illustrated by Junji Ito, the series began serialization in Comic Motto! on March 18, 2013. The series completed its serialization on October 1, 2014, the same day Comic Motto! published its final issue. Akita Shoten collected the individual chapters into a single tankōbon volume, which was released on December 19, 2014.

In February 2016, Vertical announced they licensed the series for English publication. They released the volume on January 31, 2017.

Reception
Danica Davidson from Otaku USA praised the book due to what Davidson felt was unique horror, especially when compared to previous works by Ito. Nathan Wilson from ICv2 had a similar opinion, praising the series as a good introduction into works by Ito. Katherine Dacey from Manga Critic praised the artwork and plot as coherent and provocative. Ricardo Serrano Denis from Comics Beat praised the horror in the story as unique and unusual among horror works.

At San Diego Comic-Con 2018, Brigid Alverson picked the series as the worst manga for anyone, any age.

References

External links
 

Akita Shoten manga
Horror anime and manga
Josei manga
Vertical (publisher) titles